Duets is a compilation album by English musician Sting. It was released on 19 March 2021 through A&M Records.

Background
Duets compiles 17 collaborations spanning from 1992's "It's Probably Me" with Eric Clapton from the Lethal Weapon 3 soundtrack to new songs, recorded remotely, with Melody Gardot, Zucchero and Gashi.

The standard "My Funny Valentine", recorded by Sting and Herbie Hancock as the theme song for the 2005 Japanese movie Ashura, was released as a single on 11 March 2021.

"Englishman/African In New York", a reworking of Sting's "Englishman in New York" recorded with African artist Shirazee was released as a non-album digital-only single on 19 March 2021. Shirazee had previously covered the song as "African in New York" with Sting's approval. Sting and Shirazee released a music video and performed the song on ABC's Good Morning America.

An interactive website was launched to complement the album, with details about each song, photos, as well as newly recorded video commentaries from Sting.

The album was originally scheduled to be released in November 2020, but was delayed due to manufacturing delays caused by the COVID-19 pandemic.

Several titles, such as "Simple" in performance with Ricky Martin, "Message in a Bottle" with All Saints, "Spirits" with Pato Banton from the film Ace Ventura: When Nature Calls and "Always on Your Side" in duet with Sheryl Crow, are not included in the album.

Reception

Stephen Thomas Erlewine of AllMusic wrote "Collectively, these duets showcase Sting The Polymath, a cultured and worldly individual with an ability to synthesize his diverse interests into smooth, jazzy, mature pop."  Emma Harrison of ClashMusic.com called the album "a solid return...spanning an array of genres including worldbeat, jazz, classical, blues, rock and new-age". Gary Graff of cleveland.com wrote that the songs "speak to Sting's well-documented appetite for creative diversity. And daring." Eoghan Lyng of CultureSonar wrote "Duets shows the singer/songwriter at his most inventive."  Rachel Brodsky of The Independent calls the album "a welcome opportunity to revisit Sting's lengthy collaborative CV". Alexander Baechle of Riff Magazine wrote "Duets portrays Sting as a conduit for passionate performances. On many of the songs, his contribution is understated and uncertain, serving to push the featured artist forward. Yet the fact that each song is of such polished and refined quality speaks to Sting's subtle knack for engineering holistic, arty pop songs. Though he sacrifices some amount of the spotlight, the songs, the artists and listeners benefit."

Track listing

Charts

Weekly charts

Year-end charts

References

External links

2021 compilation albums
A&M Records compilation albums
Sting (musician) compilation albums